FL-71 is a Chinese supersonic stealthy unmanned aircraft unveiled at the 2018 Zhuhai Airshow. Maximum takeoff weight will be three tonnes and it will be designed for a maximum speed of 2,200 km/h (Mach 1.8) at 50,000 ft or high subsonic cruising at 850 km/h (0.71 Mach) at 30,000 ft. The aircraft features stealth technology, including for the engine exhaust. It has a fuselage with stealth shaping, trapezoidal wings, V-tail, similar to YF-23.

References

Stealth aircraft
Unmanned military aircraft of China
V-tail aircraft
Unmanned stealth aircraft